Valadares may refer to:

Places in Portugal
 Valadares, a civil parish in Baião Municipality
 Valadares, a civil parish in Monção Municipality
 Valadares, a civil parish in São Pedro do Sul Municipality
 Valadares (Vila Nova de Gaia), a civil parish in Vila Nova de Gaia Municipality

People with the surname
 Guido Valadares (died 1976), Timorese politician and independence activist

Other uses
 Cerâmica de Valadares, a manufacturer of bathroom sanitary ware